Evan Kaufmann (born October 31, 1984) is a German-American former professional ice hockey forward who played in the Deutsche Eishockey Liga (DEL).

Playing career
Kaufmann, who is Jewish, was born in Plymouth, Minnesota and graduated from Robbinsdale Armstrong High School at Plymouth in 2003.  His great-grandparents were murdered during the Holocaust. At the University of Minnesota, Kaufmann played on the Golden Gophers hockey team and studied accounting at the Carlson School of Management. Kaufmann was a Western Collegiate Hockey Association scholar-athlete pick all four years at Minnesota.

Kaufmann moved to Germany in 2008 and received German citizenship in order to play for the national team, DEG Metro Stars of Deutsche Eishockey Liga.

On February 16, 2012, Kaufmann agreed to leave DEG at season's end and signed with fellow DEL club, Nürnberg Ice Tigers, where he played through the 2014–15 season. In July 2015, he announced his retirement from ice hockey. He played a total of 315 games in the Deutsche Eishockey Liga and won 17 caps for the German Men's National Team, including seven outings at the 2012 World Championships.

Career statistics

Regular season and playoffs

International

Career update
After retiring from professional hockey, Kaufmann began working as an investment banking analyst and was recently promoted to a vice president position.

See also
List of select Jewish ice hockey players

References

External links

1984 births
Living people
DEG Metro Stars players
Jewish ice hockey players
Jewish American sportspeople
Ice hockey players from Minnesota
Minnesota Golden Gophers men's ice hockey players
River City Lancers players
Thomas Sabo Ice Tigers players
German ice hockey forwards
21st-century American Jews